VII Photo Agency is an international photo agency wholly owned and governed by its membership.

History
The photographer owned agency was originally conceived by Gary Knight and John Stanmeyer. They were subsequently joined by Alexandra Boulat, Ron Haviv, Antonín Kratochvíl, Christopher Morris, and James Nachtwey and the agency, named after the number of founding members, was launched at the Visa pour l'image Festival in Perpignan, France, in September, 2001. VII was conceived to operate as a means of digital image distribution and representation wholly owned and controlled by the photographers it represented in response to large corporations acquiring the small photo agencies present in the industry at the time. Today the agency represents 29 members and 10 mentees.

VII established its reputation for news coverage during the war in Afghanistan that followed 9/11 and during the conflict in Israel/Palestine in 2002 and the invasion and occupation of Iraq in 2003. Their first assignment was photographing 9/11. James Nachtwey, one of the founding members of VII was packing his bags to go on an assignment for Time Magazine in the Caribbean. He looked out of his window near Wall Street in New York and saw everyone in the street looking up at the sky. He saw flames coming out of the World Trade Center just a few blocks from his apartment. Nachtwey spent the next hours photographing as the Twin Towers collapsed, killing thousands of civilians. The other six founding members of the agency flew from Europe to the USA or to Afghanistan, where they covered the fall of the Taliban, and unimaginable to them at the time, the beginning of America’s longest war. VII focused much of its energy in the ensuing years documenting the wars and violence that followed in the Middle East, wars that have killed hundreds of thousands of civilians.

From being principally focused on news for editorial clients, the agency has diversified into social media, live events, video, and creative partnerships with NGOs / colleges / universities, exhibitions in leading museums, featured appearances at major art and photo festivals, and education.

In addition to the member photographers, young photographers are mentored by full members through the VII Mentor Program and represented by the agency.The VII Mentor Program was created in 2008 and is the first mentor program of its kind.  Former mentees have gone on to build successful careers in the media. Some of them are now members of VII, Noor, and Magnum photo agencies and are working on assignments for publications like The New York Times, Time Magazine, and National Geographic.

In 2018, VII was named in a story by a journalist, Kristen Chick, which was published in the Columbia Journalism Review detailing accusations of sexually harassing behavior by a founding member, Antonin Kratochvil, against former VII members (Anastasia Taylor-Lind and Stephanie Sinclair), and accusations by them of a toxic culture amongst the VII members which enabled such behavior. Kratochvil subsequently resigned from the Agency. As a result of the accusations, VII instated a systemic change in culture, obliging all members and staff to fulfill online HR, compliance and harassment training with Emtrain and created a strict code of ethics for all members and staff.

Member list

Projects

Newest Americans: Stories From the Global City 
Newest Americans is a three-year longitudinal study at Rutgers University–Newark that will document the lives and communities of students at the university and take an in-depth look at immigration and the idea of American identity. It is a collaborative effort involving VII, Rutger's Center for Migration and the Global City (CMGC) and the Department of Arts, Culture and Media. The project, spearheaded by Tim Raphael, director of CMGC, focuses on immigrant experiences in New Jersey with Newark as the hub where these different stories converge. Notes for My Homeland was produced by  Talking Eyes Media  and is the first professionally produced piece in the storytelling project.

Evolution Tour 
For the Evolution Tour, photojournalists from VII Photo Agency, along with technical specialists from AbelCine, presented an examination of the evolving business, technology and craft of visual storytelling. This program was structured as a combination of seminars, panel discussions, hands-on workshops and networking.

European Workshops Series 
In 2015, Ed Kashi, Ron Haviv, Marcus Bleasdale, Stefano De Luigi and John Stanmeyer, all members of VII Photo Agency led photography workshops in four European capitals: Paris, Barcelona, Amsterdam and Berlin, as part of the Eyes in Progress's workshops program.

Fatal Neglect 
Through a partnership between VII, Médecins Sans Frontières (MSF, also known as Doctors Without Borders), and UNION HZ, Fatal Neglect was a multi-part documentary film project, to tell the stories of the millions of patients left behind by the global health revolution. In Fatal Neglect: The Global Health Revolution's Forgotten Patients, VII documented the impact of multidrug-resistant tuberculosis and some of the deadliest neglected tropical diseases: “kala azar,” and “sleeping sickness.” Ron Haviv and John Stanmeyer traveled to capture the stories of frontline health workers trying to fight diseases that affect millions of people and kill hundreds of thousands each year yet garner little attention from drug developers, policy makers or the mass media.

Starved for Attention 
In 2010, MSF and VII launched “Starved for Attention,” a multimedia campaign about childhood malnutrition. Petition signatures were collected from people around the world who joined the partnership in demanding that donor nations stop supplying nutritionally substandard food to malnourished children.

People who have been involved with the VII Mentor Program

References

External links

VII Photo Agency
MSF Fatal Neglect
http://www.bjp-online.com/2014/05/vii-photo-rises-to-challenges-of-changing-photographic-landscape-with-dynamic-new-agency-model/

Photography in France
Photo agencies
Artist cooperatives in the United States
Photojournalism organizations